The men's 5000 metres at the 2011 World Championships in Athletics was held at the Daegu Stadium on September 1 and 4.

Jake Robertson of New Zealand was added to the final field at the judges' discretion after twice being pushed in his qualifying race.

The tactical final was almost full contact, with a pack of 14 staying close into the penultimate lap.  Galen Rupp tried to take the kick out early.  As the pack began to break up, Eliud Kipchoge went down while the leaders began to string out the field.  Mo Farah led through the final lap as a host of Kenyan and finally Ethiopian athletes Imane Merga and Dejen Gebremeskel took a charge at him.  Bernard Lagat worked his way through the traffic, coming up behind the final two Ethiopian runners pulling past them in lane 3 on the final straight.  Lagat couldn't catch Farah.  Merga finished in third but was later disqualified for stepping on the curb, giving the bronze to Gebremeskel.

Medalists

Records
Prior to the competition, the records were as follows:

Qualification standards

Schedule

Results

Heats
Qualification: First 5 in each heat (Q) and the next 5 fastest (q) advance to the final.

Final

Ethiopia's Imane Merga was originally awarded the bronze medal, but he was later disqualified for having stepped onto the curb of the running track. His teammate Dejen Gebremeskel was elevated to the bronze medal as a result.

References

External links
5000 metres results at IAAF website
Robertson gets Final spot at New Zealand Herald online

5000
5000 metres at the World Athletics Championships